The Cabinet of the state of Gujarat, India, forms the executives branch of the Government of Gujarat.

Bhupendra Patel was sworn in as Chief Minister of Gujarat  on 26 December 2017. Here is the list of the ministers.

Council of Ministers

References

Rupani 02
Bharatiya Janata Party of Gujarat
Bharatiya Janata Party state ministries
2017 establishments in Gujarat
Cabinets established in 2017